Jānis Karlivāns (born 2 June 1982) is a Latvian decathlete. He was born in Cēsis. His personal best result is 8271 points, achieved in June 2007 in Götzis. Currently it's also Latvian record.

Achievements

References

External links
 
 
 

1982 births
Living people
People from Cēsis
Latvian decathletes
Athletes (track and field) at the 2004 Summer Olympics
Athletes (track and field) at the 2008 Summer Olympics
Olympic athletes of Latvia